Victor O. Frazer (born May 24, 1943) is a Saint Thomian lawyer and former politician, having served as the 3rd elected Delegate from the United States Virgin Islands to the United States House of Representatives. He was born in Charlotte Amalie, St. Thomas. He attended Fisk University and the Howard University Law School. He was admitted to the bar in New York, Maryland, the District of Columbia and the U.S. Virgin Islands.

Though he acted as an independent in the House, he was the candidate of the Independent Citizens Movement party and caucused with the Democrats.

Frazer served on the Interstate Commerce Commission, the Office of the City Attorney in Washington, D.C. and the United States Patent Office. He worked in the financial department at the Manufacturer's Hanover Trust Company. Frazer was the administrative assistant and counsel to Congressman Mervyn M. Dymally. He served as counsel to the Committee on the District of Columbia. He was elected as an Independent to the House, serving from January 3, 1995 – January 3, 1997. He was an unsuccessful candidate for reelection in 1996.

See also
List of African-American United States representatives

References

External links

1943 births
African-American members of the United States House of Representatives
African-American people in United States Virgin Island politics
Delegates to the United States House of Representatives from the United States Virgin Islands
Democratic Party members of the United States House of Representatives from the United States Virgin Islands
Fisk University alumni
Howard University alumni
Independent Citizens Movement politicians
Independent members of the United States House of Representatives
Independent Democrat members of the United States House of Representatives
Living people
People from Saint Thomas, U.S. Virgin Islands
People of the Interstate Commerce Commission
21st-century African-American people
20th-century African-American people